Events in the year 1998 in Japan. It corresponds to the year Heisei 10 (平成10年) in the Japanese calendar.

Incumbents
 Emperor: Akihito
 Prime Minister: Ryutaro Hashimoto (L–Okayama) until July 30, Keizo Obuchi (L–Gunma)
 Chief Cabinet Secretary: Kanezō Muraoka (L–Akita) until July 30, Hiromu Nonaka (L–Kyōto)
 Chief Justice of the Supreme Court: Shigeru Yamaguchi
 President of the House of Representatives: Sōichirō Itō (L–Miyagi)
 President of the House of Councillors: Jūrō Saitō (L–Mie) until July 25 and again from August 4
 Diet sessions: 142nd (regular, January 12 to June 18), 143rd (extraordinary, August 7 to October 16), 144th (extraordinary, November 27 to December 14)

Governors
Aichi Prefecture: Reiji Suzuki 
Akita Prefecture: Sukeshiro Terata 
Aomori Prefecture: Morio Kimura 
Chiba Prefecture: Takeshi Numata 
Ehime Prefecture: Sadayuki Iga 
Fukui Prefecture: Yukio Kurita
Fukuoka Prefecture: Wataru Asō 
Fukushima Prefecture: Eisaku Satō
Gifu Prefecture: Taku Kajiwara 
Gunma Prefecture: Hiroyuki Kodera 
Hiroshima Prefecture: Yūzan Fujita 
Hokkaido: Tatsuya Hori
Hyogo Prefecture: Toshitami Kaihara 
Ibaraki Prefecture: Masaru Hashimoto 
Ishikawa Prefecture: Masanori Tanimoto
Iwate Prefecture: Hiroya Masuda 
Kagawa Prefecture: Jōichi Hirai (until 4 September); Takeki Manabe (starting 5 September)
Kagoshima Prefecture: Tatsurō Suga 
Kanagawa Prefecture: Hiroshi Okazaki 
Kochi Prefecture: Daijiro Hashimoto 
Kumamoto Prefecture: Joji Fukushima 
Kyoto Prefecture: Teiichi Aramaki 
Mie Prefecture: Masayasu Kitagawa 
Miyagi Prefecture: Shirō Asano 
Miyazaki Prefecture: Suketaka Matsukata 
Nagano Prefecture: Gorō Yoshimura 
Nagasaki Prefecture: Isamu Takada (until 1 March); Genjirō Kaneko (starting 2 March)
Nara Prefecture: Yoshiya Kakimoto
Niigata Prefecture: Ikuo Hirayama 
Oita Prefecture: Morihiko Hiramatsu 
Okayama Prefecture: Masahiro Ishii 
Okinawa Prefecture: Masahide Ōta (until 10 December); Keiichi Inamine (starting 10 December)
Osaka Prefecture: Knock Yokoyama 
Saga Prefecture: Isamu Imoto 
Saitama Prefecture: Yoshihiko Tsuchiya
Shiga Prefecture: Minoru Inaba (until 20 July); Yoshitsugu Kunimatsu (starting 20 July)
Shiname Prefecture: Nobuyoshi Sumita 
Shizuoka Prefecture: Yoshinobu Ishikawa 
Tochigi Prefecture: Fumio Watanabe
Tokushima Prefecture: Toshio Endo 
Tokyo: Yukio Aoshima
Tottori Prefecture: Yuji Nishio 
Toyama Prefecture: Yutaka Nakaoki
Wakayama Prefecture: Isamu Nishiguchi 
Yamagata Prefecture: Kazuo Takahashi 
Yamaguchi Prefecture: Sekinari Nii 
Yamanashi Prefecture: Ken Amano

Events
 February 7 – February 22: The 1998 Winter Olympics are held in Nagano.
 March 5 – March 14: The 1998 Winter Paralympics are held in Nagano.
 April 1: Toyota City, Fukuyama City, Kōchi City and Miyazaki City become core cities. 
 April 5: The Akashi-Kaikyo Bridge linking Shikoku with Honshū and costing about ¥ 500 billion (US$3.8 billion), opens to traffic, becoming the largest suspension bridge in the world.
 May 26: Takashi Imai is inaugurated as the 9th head of the Keidanren.
 June 22: Financial Services Agency established.
 July 5: Japan launches the Nozomi probe to Mars, joining the United States and Russia as an outer space-exploring nation.
 July 12: Election for the House of Councillors held.
 July 25: Masumi Hayashi poisons a curry pot at a festival in Wakayama, causing the death of two adults and two children.
 September 3: Metal Gear Solid is first released for the PS1 in Japan. 
 September 22 – 23: Typhoon Vivki causes damage to several cultural heritage sites in Wakayama, Nara, Kyoto and Shiga Prefecture and causing 19 deaths. 
 October 8: Japan-South Korea Joint Declaration of 1998.
 November 13: Free solo climber Alain Robert scales the Shinjuku Center Building and is arrested on its roof.
 November 26: Japan-China Joint Declaration On Building a Partnership of Friendship and Cooperation for Peace and Development.
 December 18: Mario Party is released in Japan.

Births
 January 5 - Marie Iitoyo, model and actress
 February 8 - Rui Hachimura, basketball player
 March 19 - Sakura Miyawaki, singer (currently a member of Le Sserafim)
 March 26 - Satoko Miyahara, figure skater
 April 6 - Rina Katsuta, singer
 April 10 - Airi Kinoshita, murder victim (d. 2005)
 April 28 - Manamo Miyata, singer and member of Hinatazaka46
 May 13 - Karen Iwata, singer and voice actress
 May 28 - Riho Sayashi, J-pop singer
 June 14 - Taishi Nakagawa, actor and model
 June 19 - Suzu Hirose, model and actress
 July 9 - Tiger Onitsuka, jazz drummer
 July 16 - Rina Matsuno, singer (d. 2017)
 July 17 - Shione Sawada, actress
 July 26 - Maya Sakura, singer
 July 27 - Risa Watanabe, idol and model
 August 5 - Kanon Suzuki, singer
 August 17 - Yoshinobu Yamamoto, professional baseball player
 August 28 - Haruka Fukuhara, actress, model and singer
 October 30 - Meimi Tamura, singer and actress
 November 12 - Yuna Taira, actress
 November 29 - Ayumu Hirano, snowboarder
 December 30 - Akari Uemura, pop singer

Deaths
 January 9 – Kenichi Fukui, Japanese chemist, Nobel Prize laureate (b. 1918)
 January 21 – Yoshifumi Kondō, animator (b. 1950)
 January 26 – Shinichi Suzuki, violinist (b. 1898)
 January 27 – Tamio Kageyama, novelist (b. 1947)
 January 28 – Shotaro Ishinomori, Manga artist, "Father of Henshin heroes." (b. 1938)
 February 5 – Takahashi Chikuzan, Tsugaru-jamisen performer and composer (b. 1910)
 March 10 – Kenkō Satoshi, Sumo wrestler (b. 1967)
 March 13 – Kosho Uchiyama, Sōtō priest (b. 1912)
 April 20 – Yoshio Inaba, actor (b. 1920)
 May 2 – Matsumoto Hideto (hide),  Japanese musician (b. 1964)
 May 10 – Nekojiru, manga artist (b. 1967)
 May 19 – Sōsuke Uno, Prime Minister (b. 1922)
 August 3 – Reizo Koike, breaststroke swimmer (b. 1915)
 August 28 – Hirokazu Kobayashi, aikidoka (b. 1929)
 September 6 – Akira Kurosawa, screenwriter, producer, and director (b. 1910)
 September 27 – Narita Bryan, racehorse (b. 1991)
 October 12 – Ineko Sata, communist and feminist author of proletarian literature (b. 1904)
 November 1 – Silence Suzuka, racehorse (b. 1994)
 November 5 – Momoko Kōchi, actress (b. 1932)
 December 1 – Shōji Nakayama, actor (b. 1928)
 December 2 – Mikio Oda, athlete (b. 1905)
 December 30 – Keisuke Kinoshita, film director (b. 1912)

See also
 1998 in Japanese television
 List of Japanese films of 1998

References

 
Years of the 20th century in Japan
Japan